RAEC may refer to:

R.A.E.C. Mons (1910), a Belgian football club which used this name between 1934 and its dissolution in 2015
R.A.E.C. Mons (2015), a club which has used this name since 2020.
Royal Army Educational Corps
Royal Aero Club (RAeC)